The Black Nunataks are a group of about nine nunataks located  west-southwest of Mount Harding in the Grove Mountains, Antarctica. They were mapped by Australian National Antarctic Research Expeditions from air photos, 1956–60, and named by the Antarctic Names Committee of Australia after I. Black, a geophysicist at Mawson Station, 1963.

References 

Nunataks of Princess Elizabeth Land